Events from the year 1990 in Portuguese Macau.

Incumbents
 Governor - Carlos Montez Melancia

Events

June
 24 June - The opening of the new building of Maritime Museum in São Lourenço.

References

 
Years of the 20th century in Macau
Macau
Macau
1990s in Macau